The Awakening is a live performance album by Nekropolis, released in 1997 by Ohrwaschl Records.

Track listing

Personnel
Adapted from the liner notes of The Awakening.

Musicians
 Werner Aldinger – trombone
 Peter Becker – guitar, voice
 Peter Frohmader – bass guitar, fretless bass guitar, eight-string bass guitar, electronics, kalimba, gong, voice, cover art
 Spix – German flute, bass clarinet
 Martin Stopper – drums, kalimba

Production and additional personnel
 Nekropolis – production
 Rudi Neuber – photography

Release history

References 

1997 live albums
Nekropolis albums